Kyle Louis Bosworth (born November 21, 1986) is a former American football linebacker in the National Football League for the Jacksonville Jaguars and Dallas Cowboys. He was signed by the Jacksonville Jaguars as an undrafted free agent in 2010. He played college football at UCLA.

Early years
Bosworth attended Plano West Senior High School, where he played as a linebacker and fullback. As a junior, he registered 116 tackles (4 for loss) and 4 fumble recoveries. He received All-District, All-County, All-County MVP, All-County Defensive Player of the Year and honorable-mention All-State honors.

As a senior, he tallied 115 tackles (12 for loss), one sack, 3 interceptions and 6 touchdowns, while contributing to the school winning its first city championship. The team won the 2004 Bi-District championship and was an Area finalist. He received All-District, All-County, Co-Defensive Player of the Year honors and honorable-mention All-State honors. He was selected to play in the 2005 Coca-Cola Bowl. He finished high school career with 231 tackles, 12 tackles for loss, 3 interceptions, one sack and six fumble recoveries.

He also competed in track, in the shot put, discus throw and 440 metres relay events. He was third in the District 8-5A discus with a mark of 143-5 1/2 as a senior.

College career
Bosworth accepted a football scholarship from UCLA. As a freshman, he appeared in 8 games, playing primarily on the kickoff special teams units. He missed 2 games with an injured thumb.

As a sophomore, he appeared in all 13 games with one start. He played primarily on special teams and posted 13 defensive tackles (7 solo). On September 1, he made 2 tackles against Stanford as UCLA won 45–17. He played the entire second half in place of injured middle linebacker Christian Taylor and had 4 tackles against the University of Arizona. He made his first college start against the University of Oregon and had two tackle assists.

As a junior, he appeared in all 13 games with 7 starts. He had 74 tackles (fifth on the team). On September 1, 2008, he recorded 5 tackles and a pass defended against No. 18 ranked Tennessee as UCLA won in overtime 27–24. He had 8 tackles (one for loss) and one pass defensed against Oregon State University. He had 19 tackles (eighth in school history) against Washington State University. He had 12 tackles in the 2007 Las Vegas Bowl.

As a senior in 2008, he appeared in only 2 games with 2 starts. He sprained his knee against Brigham Young University and missed the final 10 games of the season.

Bosworth received a medical redshirt after his injury and came back as a fifth year senior in 2009. He appeared in 13 games with 12 starts. He totaled 77 tackles (second on the team), 7.5 tackles for loss (sixth on the team) and 1.5 sacks. On September 5, 2009, he recorded 4 tackles against San Diego State while UCLA went on to win the game 33–14. On September 12, he made 10 tackles against Tennessee helping UCLA win that the game 19-15. On September 19, 2009, he recorded 4 tackles against Kansas State as UCLA wins the game 23-9. On October 3, he had 8 tackles against Stanford as UCLA lost 16-24. He was Defensive Co-winner of UCLA's Jerry Long "Heart" Award following the conclusion of the season.

He finished his college career with 49 game appearances, 21 starts, 174 tackles (106 solo), 2 sacks, 12.5 tackles for loss, 3 passes defensed and 2 forced fumbles.

Professional career

2010 NFL Combine

Jacksonville Jaguars
Bosworth was signed as an undrafted free agent by the Jacksonville Jaguars after the 2010 NFL Draft on April 24. He was placed on the injured reserve list on September 4.

On November 15, 2011, he was placed on the injured reserve list because of a broken hand he suffered against the Indianapolis Colts in Week 9. He appeared in 9 games and made 7 special teams tackles.

In the Jaguars' 2012 season opener against the Minnesota Vikings, he started at outside linebacker in place of the injured Daryl Smith. He started 5 games, making 53 defensive tackles (4 tackles for loss), one interception and 14 special teams tackles (led the team). He wasn't re-signed after the season.

New York Giants
On May 29, 2013, he signed as a free agent with the New York Giants. He was released on August 31.

Dallas Cowboys
On September 1, 2013, the Dallas Cowboys replaced defensive lineman Sean Lissemore by claiming Bosworth off waivers, in order to help improve their special teams units. He was released on December 17. He appeared in 14 games and finished tied for second on the team with 12 special teams tackles.

Personal life
He is the nephew of former NFL linebacker, Brian Bosworth. His twin brother, Korey, was signed as an undrafted free agent by the Denver Broncos, but was waived.  

Bosworth married The Real Housewives of Orange County star Kara Keough February 8, 2014. Their second child, first son, McCoy Casey Bosworth, died almost immediately after birth, from shoulder dystocia and compressed umbilical cord, in April 2020. 

He is currently a licensed real estate agent in both Texas and Florida, including being a cofounder of RedZone Realty Group with former Jacksonville Jaguars teammate Jason Babin.

References

External links
 UCLA Bruins bio

1986 births
Living people
Identical twins
Sportspeople from Plano, Texas
Players of American football from Texas
American football outside linebackers
UCLA Bruins football players
Jacksonville Jaguars players
Dallas Cowboys players
American twins
Twin sportspeople